The Magnesian Conglomerate is a geological formation in Clifton, Bristol in England (originally Avon), Gloucestershire and southern Wales, present in Tytherington, Durdham Down and Cromhall Quarry. It dates back to the Rhaetian stage of the Late Triassic, although it may be as old as the Norian stage of the Late Triassic and as young as the Hettangian stage of the Early Jurassic. This formation was first discovered in autumn 1834 and was studied in 1836 by Henry Riley and Samuel Stutchbury.

The Avon Fissure Fill is probably the same formation as the Magnesian Conglomerate.

Vertebrate paleofauna

See also 
 List of dinosaur-bearing rock formations
 List of fossiliferous stratigraphic units in England

References

Bibliography

Further reading 

 Riley, H. and Stutchbury, S. 1840. A description of various fossil remains of three distinct saurian animals recently discovered in the Magnesian Conglomerate near Bristol Transactions of the Geological Society of London 5, 349–357
 W. Buckland. 1824. Reliquiæ Diluvianæ; or, Observations on the Organic Remains Contained in Caves, Fissures, and Diluvial Gravel, and on Other Geological Phenomena, Attesting the Action of an Universal Deluge. Second Edition. John Murray, London 1-303

External links 
 British Geological Survey Lexicon of Named Rock Units

Geologic formations of England
Triassic System of Europe
Triassic England
Rhaetian Stage
Conglomerate formations
Limestone formations
Fossiliferous stratigraphic units of Europe
Paleontology in England
Formations